State Highway 178 (SH 178) is a Texas state highway in the city of El Paso in El Paso County maintained by the Texas Department of Transportation (TxDOT). The  route designated in 1991 connects New Mexico State Road 136 at the New Mexico state line between El Paso and Santa Teresa, NM to a freeway carrying Interstate 10, U.S. Route 85, and U.S. Route 180 on the west side of El Paso.  The route together with NM 136 is a major urban roadway connecting an international border crossing with I-10. The route also has an important intersection with SH 20.

The route's numerical designation was previously assigned to a road in the Texas Panhandle during the 1930s. An extension to the current route potentially doubling its length was considered and rejected in recent years.

History

Hartley and Moore counties
SH 178 was previously proposed on October 25, 1932 as a connector route between the cities of Hartley and Dumas in Hartley and Moore counties in the Texas Panhandle. By 1936, the Hartley County portion had been completed with the Moore County portion following by 1940. On June 21, 1938, SH 178 was cancelled, as the route became part of SH 152.

El Paso County
The current route in El Paso was designated on June 26, 1991. TxDOT proposed extending the route an additional  to Loop 375 on June 30, 1994, but those plans were dropped on October 25, 2007.

Route description
SH 178 is a major urban thoroughfare on El Paso's west side that is locally known as Artcraft Rd. The route is a four to six-lane divided highway beginning at NM 136, or Pete V. Domenici International Highway, at the New Mexico state line between El Paso and Santa Teresa in Doña Ana County, NM. The route proceeds east along Artcraft Rd. crossing the Rio Grande shortly before intersecting SH 20 at Doniphan Dr. The route then continues east ending at the combined I-10, US 85, and US 180 freeway where the roadway continues eastward as Paseo del Norte Rd.

SH 178 and NM 136 together form a connection between the Santa Teresa-San Jerónimo, Chih. Port of Entry and I-10 bypassing Sunland Park, NM, Santa Teresa, and central El Paso.

Major intersections

See also

References

External links

178
Transportation in El Paso County, Texas
Transportation in El Paso, Texas